David Abdón Galeano Olivera (born February 18, 1961 in Asunción) is a Paraguayan linguist, anthropologist, philologist, translator, and educator.  He is also the president and founder of the Lyceum of Guarani Language and Culture.

Background 
Dr. Olivera studied at Gral. Bernardino Caballero College in Asunción in 1979. He received his bachelor's degree in Guarani at the Universidad Nacional de Asunción in 1985, and earned doctorates in the following specialties: Linguistics and Philology of Guarani (in 1998–1999), Methodology of Research (2000), University Didactics (1994–1995), and Common Linguistics (1987). At Ntra. Sra. de la Asunción Catholic University he became a Doctor of Anthropology (1988) and International Anthropology and Ethnology (1991).

Work at university 
Dr. Olivera is a professor at Universidad Nacional de Asunción and teaches Philosophy (philology of Guarani), Medicine, Poli-technology, Nature, and Exact Sciences. He is the head of the department of Anthropology, Research Methodology, Sociology and Spanish.

Guarani language 
Dr. Olivera founded the Lyceum of Guarani Language and Culture (Ateneo de Lengua y Cultura Guarani) in 1985 and has been its president since then. He is also a professor of Grammar, Literature, Didactics and Culture at the lyceum. Dr. Olivera  is an activist for the propagation of Guarani language and culture, and he organizes various cultural events, conferences, seminars, and forums about Guarani in Paraguay. He is a member of various government and UN commissions on Paraguayan culture. Dr. Olivera is also the author of numerous books on Guarani and Paraguayan culture. Dr. Olivera has won various national and international prizes as a result of his work.

Bibliography
Mbo’ehao arapapaha Guarani ha España ñe’ême - Calendario Escolar Bilingüe (1988)
Jakavere ypykue (15 káso ñemombe’u) (1989)
Guarani Rayhupápe mbohapyha (1995)
Guarani Rayhupápe irundyha (1995)
Differencias gramaticales entre el Guarani y el Castellano: estudio contrastivo, y su incidencia en la educación (1999)
Káso Ñemombe’u (1999)
Antropología – Avakuaaty (2002)
Guarani Ñe’êkuaaty – Lingüística (en) Guarani (2002)
Sentimientos - Temiandu Pytu (2002)
Pukarâmeme (2007)
Pukarântevoi (2007)

He also writes articles in newspapers and magazines, and essays for conferences.

Family  
Mr. David Galeano Olivera lives in Capiatá, Central department with his wife Sabina (specialist in Guarani) and his four children Edgar, Norma, Jorge and Anai.

References 
Site at the net
Guarani Rayhupape, 2006 Asunción

External links 
Personal website 
David Abdón Galeano Olivera's user page on the Guarani Wikipedia
Ateneo de Lengua y Cultura Guarani 

1961 births
Living people
People from Asunción
Universidad Nacional de Asunción alumni
Anthropological linguists
Academic staff of Universidad Nacional de Asunción
Linguists from Paraguay
Paraguayan activists
Paraguayan anthropologists
Paraguayan educational theorists
Guarani-language writers
Paraguayan philologists
Paraguayan translators
Translators from Guaraní
Translators to Guaraní